Koilodepas is a genus of plant of the family Euphorbiaceae first described as a genus in 1856. It is native to Southeast Asia, India, Hainan, and New Guinea.

Species

Formerly included
moved to Claoxylon 
Koilodepas hosei Merr., synonym of Claoxylon hosei (Merr.) Airy Shaw

References

Epiprineae
Euphorbiaceae genera